Paul Robson may refer to:

 Paul Robson (footballer) (born 1983), English footballer
 Paul Robson (jockey), Scottish jockey
 Paul Robson (Canadian football) (born 1941), Canadian football player

See also
 Paul Robeson (1898–1976), American bass singer, actor and civil rights activist
 Paul Robeson Jr. (1927–2014), his son, American author, archivist and historian